The Bay Shore Brawlers are a semi-pro football team based in Laurence Harbor, New Jersey. Their home field is at the Little League Complex, at the senior field.

The Brawlers compete in the Pennsylvania 6 Man Football League. In 2006, the Brawlers were known as the Aberdeen/Bayshore Celtics and went undefeated and went on to win the league championship, in their inaugural season. For the 2007 season the Bayshore Brawlers will not be charging admission for their home games, though the team will be collecting non-perishable items that will be donated to local food pantries throughout the Bayshore. After finishing the regular season with a 5-1 record the Brawlers would win their 2nd Keystone Bowl over the Williamsport Wildcats. The Brawlers' second home game will be played on August 2 with a 12 PM kickoff. Admission is still free of charge for the '08 season.  The Brawlers were founded by former Arena and European Fullback, William C. Smith III.

Season-By-Season

|-
| colspan="6" align="center" | Aberdeen/Bayshore Celtics (P6MFL)
|-
|2006 || 6 || 0 || 0 || 1st Northern || Won ND Championship (Susquehanna Valley)Won Keystone Bowl II (Middletown)
|-
| colspan="6" align="center" | Bay Shore Brawlers (P6MFL)
|-
|2007 || 5 || 1 || 0 || 1st Southern || Won SD Divisional (Lykens)Won Keystone Bowl III (Williamsport)
|-
!Totals || 15 || 1 || 0
|colspan="2"|
! Opponent
|-
| J
| vs. Sunbury Devils W 73-6
|-
| August 18
| @ Williamsport Wildcats W 38-22
|-
| August 25
| vs. Middletown Renegades W 76-19
|-
| September 8
| @ Susquehenna Valley Stallions W 45-0
|-
|}

External links 
 Bay Shore Brawlers
 Brawlers MySpace page

American football teams in New Jersey
American football teams in the New York metropolitan area